Cheadle railway station may refer to

 Cheadle railway station, a former station in Cheadle, Staffordshire (1901–1963)
 Cheadle North railway station,  a former Cheshire Lines Committee station in Cheadle, Cheshire (1866–1964). Since 1974 in Metropolitan County of Greater Manchester.
 Cheadle railway station (London and North Western Railway),  a former LNWR station in Cheadle, Cheshire (1866–1917). Since 1974 in Metropolitan County of Greater Manchester. 
 Cheadle Hulme railway station, on the Crewe to Manchester Piccadilly via Stockport line in Cheadle Hulme, Greater Manchester (opened 1842)
 Cheadle Heath railway station, a former Midland Railway station in Cheadle, Cheshire (1901–1967). Since 1974 in Metropolitan County of Greater Manchester.

See also
 Cheadle branch line